Juan Castillo (born October 8, 1959) is an American football coach who is the tight ends coach for the Washington Commanders of the National Football League (NFL). He played college football at Texas A&I as a linebacker and played for the San Antonio Gunslingers of the United States Football League in the mid–1980s. Castillo then coached high school and college football before joining the Eagles in 1995 as an offensive assistant. He has served as both a coach for tight ends and the offensive line.

College career
Castillo earned a scholarship worth $500 to attend Texas A&I after spending a semester at the Monterrey Institute of Technology and Higher Education. He played college football while enrolled.

Professional career
Castillo played for the San Antonio Gunslingers of the USFL from 1984–1985, mainly on special teams. In 1984, Castillo saw action in six games, making four tackles and three assists. In 1985, Castillo played in seven games, making eight tackles and registering three assists on a 5–13 club.

Coaching career

H.M. King High School
Castillo coached linebackers and was the defensive line coach at Henrietta M. King High School from 1986 to 1989.

Texas A&M University–Kingsville
Castillo was the defensive line coach for Texas A&M University–Kingsville from 1982 to 1985 and from 1990 to 1994 he was the offensive line coach. Four offensive linemen he coached ended up in the NFL: Jermane Mayberry, Jorge Diaz, Kevin Dogins, and Earl Dotson.

Philadelphia Eagles
The Philadelphia Eagles hired Castillo as an offensive assistant in 1995 under Ray Rhodes. In 1996, the Eagles drafted Jermane Mayberry, an offensive lineman Castillo coached at Texas A&M University–Kingsville, in the first round of the 1996 NFL Draft. Castillo was promoted to tight ends coach in 1997, and switched to coaching the offensive line in 1998. When Andy Reid was hired as the head coach of the Eagles in 1999, he retained Castillo on the coaching staff. Mayberry earned a Pro Bowl berth in 2002, and said Castillo "molded me into the player I became." Castillo coached the offensive line for thirteen seasons, from 1998 to 2010.

Castillo became the defensive coordinator for the Eagles following the firing of Sean McDermott on February 2, 2011.  The hiring was met with surprise by players, fans, and members of the media primarily because Castillo had not coached the defensive side of the ball since he was at Kingsville in 1989. Castillo was fired on October 16, 2012.

Baltimore Ravens
On January 21, 2013, Castillo was hired as a consultant by the Baltimore Ravens. At the time of the hiring, the Ravens were preparing to play in Super Bowl XLVII. Castillo would officially join the coaching staff for the 2013 season as the run-game coordinator and held the job for one season, before serving as the offensive line coach from 2014 to 2016.

Buffalo Bills
In 2017, Castillo was hired by the Buffalo Bills to become the offensive line coach and run-game coordinator under new head coach Sean McDermott. He served two seasons with the Bills before being dismissed following the 2018 season.

Michigan
Castillo joined the Michigan Wolverines coaching staff as an offensive analyst for the 2019 season. As part of his duties, Castillo worked with Michigan offensive line coach Ed Warinner.

Chicago Bears
Castillo was hired by the Chicago Bears as offensive line coach on January 5, 2020. The move reunited him with head coach Matt Nagy, whom he worked with in Philadelphia. He was not retained by the team following the firing of Nagy after the 2021 season.

Washington Commanders
He was named tight ends coach of the Washington Commanders on February 21, 2022.

Personal life
Castillo fractured his left tibial plateau after he was hit by a utility truck outside of Veterans Stadium on August 17, 1998. His hometown of Port Isabel declared July 4, 2009, to be "Juan Castillo Day".

He has four children from his first  marriage; Gregory, John, Andres and Antonio. He and his second wife, Kelly, married in July 2022, in Virginia . She has two children, Franco and Vivienne.

References

External links
Washington Commanders bio

1959 births
Living people
American football linebackers
Baltimore Ravens coaches
Buffalo Bills coaches
Chicago Bears coaches
Michigan Wolverines football coaches
National Football League defensive coordinators
Philadelphia Eagles coaches
Washington Commanders coaches
San Antonio Gunslingers players
Texas A&M–Kingsville Javelinas football coaches
High school football coaches in Texas
People from Cameron County, Texas
People from Kleberg County, Texas
Players of American football from Texas
American sportspeople of Mexican descent